Golam Rahman was a Bangladeshi journalist and writer. He was awarded Bangla Academy Literary Award for his contribution to Bengali literature.

Early life
Rahman was born on 28 November 1931 in Kolkata, West Bengal, British India. He studied law at Surendranath Law College but moved to Dhaka following the Partition of India and as a result could not finish his studies. He joined Jagannath College but dropped out before graduation.

Career
Rahman worked at Daily Ittehad and Daily Insaf while leaving in Kolkata. He edited the Madhumala, a weekly. He was elected Assistant Secretary of the East Pakistan Journalists' Union. His novel, Golam Rahman Rachanabali, was published by Bangla Academy. He was awarded Bangla Academy Literary Award in 1969.

Bibliography
Rakamfer (1953)
Panur Pathshala (1953) 
Badi Niye Badabadi (1957)
Buddhir Dhenki (1958) 
Chakmaki (1960) 
Jyanta Chhabir Bhojbaji (1960) 
Russ Desher Rupkatha (1960)
Ishaper Galpa (1966)
Neta O Rani (1954)
Amader Bir Sangrami (1970)

Death
Rahman was murdered on 13 January 1972 shortly after the Independence of Bangladesh.

References

1931 births
1972 deaths
Murder in Bangladesh
Recipients of Bangla Academy Award
Bangladeshi journalists
20th-century Bangladeshi writers
People from Kolkata
20th-century journalists
Surendranath Law College alumni